Mount Tricouni is a prominent peak, 1,630 m, rising steeply 2 nautical miles (3.7 km) north of Hobnail Peak on the east side of Skelton Glacier, in the Hillary Coast region of the Ross Dependency. Surveyed and named in 1957 by the New Zealand party of the Commonwealth Trans-Antarctic Expedition, 1956–58. So named because it resembles a tricouni, a saw-toothed nail used on soles of alpine boots.

See also
Pari Haupapa Cliffs, extend north–south between Wirdnam Glacier and Mount Tricouni

References

External links

Mountains of the Ross Dependency
Hillary Coast